Baby Beach officially known as Klein Lagoen, is a shallow, sheltered man-altered lagoon located in the Mangle Cora locality near the village of Seroe Colorado (formerly Roode Berg), on the south-west side of the  south-east end of the island of Aruba. It is frequented by locals and tourists. It is nicknamed Baby Beach as the water is so calm it is safe for very small children. Because of the calm water, snorkeling at this beach is safe for children and others new to snorkeling.

The beach is popular mostly due to the lack of waves and the shallow water. The "Refineria di Aruba" oil refinery is within sight of Baby Beach. However, because of the direction of local currents, Baby Beach has clean, clear water.

The water level is generally waist high on the inside but towards the inlet, it deepens significantly. Marine life in the lagoon includes barracuda, squid, parrot fish, blowfish, angelfish, eels, and many other small fish. The range of most of these animals is limited to the inlet.

At the beach there is a small snack stand, and chairs and umbrellas for rent. Four-wheel-drive cars, for driving around the beach, are also available to rent.

This is not a nude beach. Public nudity is illegal on Aruba. Topless sunbathing is tolerated on beaches in resort areas, though not on resort grounds. Topless beaches include the Renaissance Island and De Palm Island. These islands have adult beach areas where topless sunbathing and swimming are allowed.

History
In the 1950s, the Aruba Esso Club was built as part of Lago Colony (present-day Seroe Colorado), at Baby Beach (on the west side of the lagoon). The club included a restaurant, dance floor, and a baseball stadium. In the lagoon, there was a dock and small shacks (one of which is still standing). Today, there is only one large, abandoned building (with one business, a dive shop, still in operation).

See also
Lago Colony

References

External links
Baby Beach (on Aruba Tourism website)

Beaches of Aruba
San Nicolaas